Pearl River was an American country music band composed of Jeff Stewart (lead vocals), Chuck Ethredge (lead guitar), Joe Morgan (bass guitar), Derek George (rhythm guitar, background vocals), Ken Fleming (drums), and Bryan Culpepper (keyboards, background vocals). Signed to Liberty Records in 1993, the band would record two albums: 1993's Find out What's Happening, followed by a self-titled album one year later. This later album replaced Fleming with Steve Argo who was picked by Fleming to be his replacement after Fleming decided to leave the band, and Culpepper with Gary Schiera. The first album also produced a minor hit single on the Billboard Hot Country Singles & Tracks (now Hot Country Songs) charts in the single "Fool to Fall". After disbanding in 1994, some members of Pearl River served as a backing band for Bryan White.

Biography
Pearl River was founded in the early 1990s in Philadelphia, Mississippi.  In 1993. Later that year while working with Marty Gamblin of Glen Campbell’s publishing company, they were discovered by a representative of Capitol Records, who signed the band to the record's Liberty Records division. Their first album, entitled Find Out What's Happening, was issued that year and was produced by Jerry Crutchfield. It produced one chart single, "Fool to Fall", which peaked at No. 62 on the Billboard Hot Country Singles & Tracks charts. The title track was originally released by Bobby Bare in 1968 and late released as single for Tanya Tucker from her album Fire to Fire. Also included on this album was the song "Cast Iron Heart", which would later be recorded by Blackhawk on their 1996 album Strong Enough and by Linda Davis on her 1996 album Some Things Are Meant to Be.

Pearl River, was issued in 1994, under the production of Steve Gibson. Its only single, "Hello Goodbye", failed to enter the charts. This album featured two more tracks which would later be recorded by other artists: "You've Always Got Me", later found on Aaron Tippin's 1995 album Tool Box (which was also produced by Steve Gibson), and "Heartbroke Every Day", which Lonestar recorded on their 1995 album Lonestar and released as a single in 1996.

After Pearl River disbanded in 1994, several of its members were recruited as a backing band for Bryan White, who had previously worked as a T-shirt vendor for the band. By 1994, White was signed to a recording contract with Asylum Records. Former guitarist Derek George also co-wrote several of Bryan's singles, in addition to producing White's albums. He also made an appearance on Steve Wariner's 1996 album No More Mr. Nice Guy on the track "The Brickyard Boogie", for which he received a Grammy Award nomination in 1997. White and George also co-wrote Diamond Rio's 1998 single "Imagine That," and worked as a session musician before forming the band Williams Riley. After Williams Riley disbanded, George became a producer for Joe Nichols and Randy Houser.

Discography
Find Out What's Happening (1993)
Pearl River (1994)

Singles

Music videos

References

Country music groups from Mississippi
Musical groups established in 1993
Liberty Records artists
1993 establishments in Mississippi
People from Philadelphia, Mississippi